Bryonn Bain is a poet, actor, prison activist, scholar, author, hip hop artist and professor of African American Studies and World Arts & Cultures in the School of the Arts  and the School of Law at the University of California at Los Angeles.

His one-man show, Lyrics From Lockdown, won "Best Solo Performance" from the LA Weekly and NAACP. Executive produced by Harry Belafonte, the show tells stories of wrongful incarceration through spoken word poetry, hip hop theater, calypso, comedy and classical music. Bain founded the Prison Education Program at UCLA in 2015. In 2019, the program and his performances at the Kennedy Center for the Performing Arts were featured on the debut episode of LA Stories which won an Emmy Award. Bain hosted My Two Cents, a current affairs talk show on BET for five consecutive seasons, and starred in Pig Hunt, the last film directed by Academy Award winner James Isaac. A Tony nominated theater maker, Bain was a producer of the Broadway revival of Ntozake Shange's classic "For Colored Girls Who Have Considered Suicide / When the Rainbow is Enuf.” 

Family and Education

Born in New York City to parents who immigrated to Brooklyn from Trinidad, Bain is the eldest of five children. His West Indian father was a calypso singer and then a soldier, and his mom of South Asian descent, served as a registered ICU nurse for over 40 years. Bain attended Columbia University at the age of 16 and studied Political Science with a concentration in Black Studies. He went on to earn a Master's Degree in Urban Politics, Cultural Studies and Performance from the Gallatin School at New York University. He also earned a Juris Doctorate from Harvard Law School.

Work

Poetry 
Bain was the Boston Grand Slam Champion in 1999, and in 2000, he was the Nuyorican Grand Slam Poetry Champion. Bain ranked #1 in the nation and placed second in the world during the 2000 International Poetry Slam.

Organizing 
Bain founded the Blackout Arts Collective in 1997. He organized artists, activists and educators of color to create a space to organize justice movement campaigns, produce social impact-focused art, and facilitate political education workshops in public schools and prisons around the country. At its peak, BAC had chapters in 10 cities around the country.

Prison 
Bain has developed and taught courses linking prisons with Columbia University, New York University, The New School, Long Island University, University of California at Los Angeles and internationally at Oxford and Cambridge, in the UK and Muteesa I Royal University in Uganda.

His work has reached prisons in 25 states in the United States including Rikers Island, Sing Sing, Wallkill, DC Jail, Metropolitan Detention Center, Boys Town Detention Center, California Institution for Women, Custody to Community Transitional Reentry Program, Barry J Nidorf Juvenile Hall, Central Juvenile Hall and Folsom. Bain founded the Prison Education Program at UCLA in 2015. In 2019, the program and his performances at the Kennedy Center were featured on the debut episode of LA Stories which won an Emmy Award.

Performance 

Bain’s work has been featured at the Apollo Theater, Carnegie Hall, Lincoln Center, The Public Theater, The National Black Theatre, Rikers Island (New York), New Jersey Performing Arts Center (Newark), The Actor’s Gang Theater (Culver City), Los Angeles Theater Center (Los Angeles), Festival de Liege (Belgium), M-1 Theater Festival (Singapore), Universidad de las Americas (Mexico) and Muteesa Royal University (Uganda), Marion Prison (Ohio), TEDX at Ironwood State Prison and Sing Sing Prison.

Discography

Albums
2015 Life After Lockdown
2008 Don't Be Scared
2005 Problem Child: The Philosophy and Opinions of Bryonn Bain

Filmography

2022 The Ugly Side of Beautiful
2019 Windows on the World
2018 On My Way
2017 Why Prosecutors Matter
2016 Chapter and Verse
2015 BaaaddD Sonia
2014 The Darkest Hour: The Impact of Isolation and Death Row
2008 Pig Hunt
2007 Lyrical Minded 415
2005 Filmic Achievement
2003 Urban Scribe
2002 Hunting in America

Published works 
The Prophet Returns: the hip hop generation remix of a classic. New York. 2011. ISBN 978-0-615-46982-9. OCLC 812712654.
The Ugly Side of Beautiful: Rethinking Race and Prison in America. Mumia Abu-Jamal, Lani Guinier (1 ed.). Chicago. 2012. ISBN 978-0-88378-344-3. OCLC 825113457.
Fish & Bread/Pescado y Pan, Brown Girls Books, 2015
Rebel Speak: A Justice Movement Mixtape. UC Press. 2022. ISBN 9780520388437.

References

External links 
 

University of California, Los Angeles faculty
African-American poets
American male poets
21st-century American poets
20th-century American poets
African-American activists
Prison reformers
Black studies scholars
Hip hop activists
African-American male rappers
Year of birth missing (living people)
Living people
Columbia University alumni
Harvard Law School alumni
New York University Gallatin School of Individualized Study alumni